Dingley Dell may refer to:

Places 
 Dingley Dell Conservation Park, South Australia, Australia
 Dingley Dell Museum, home of Adam Lindsay Gordon (1833–1870)
 Dingley Dell (dwelling), a heritage-listed house in Robe, South Australia, Australia
 Dingley Dell, Queensland, a neighbourhood in Camboon, Queensland, Australia

Other uses 
 Dingley Dell, a fictional place in The Pickwick Papers
 Dingley Dell F.C., an association football club in London in the late 1850s/early 1860s

See also
 Dingly Dell, a 1972 album by Lindisfarne
 Dingle Dell meteorite
 Dingle Dell, a section of the Brands Hatch motor racing circuit